Nigresent Dissolution is a demo album by Infernäl Mäjesty. It was originally released in 1988 on a Demo tape and as bonus tracks on the 1998 re-issued version of None Shall Defy by Displeased Records. it is also their last release to feature the original line-up.

Track listing
  "Into the Unknown"  – 5:11   
  "Hell on Earth"  – 8:10

Credits
 Chris Bailey– vocals 
 Steve Terror– guitar 
 Rick Nemes– drums 
 Kenny Hallman– guitar  
 Psycopath– bass

References
  

Infernäl Mäjesty albums
1988 albums
Demo albums